The Mayor of Ruapehu officiates over the Ruapehu District of New Zealand's North Island. Since 2022, the mayor is Weston Kirton who previously held the role from 1995 to 2001.

Don Cameron was mayor from 2013 to 2022.

List of mayors

References

Ruapehu
Mayors of places in Manawatū-Whanganui
Ruapehu District
Ruapehu